Mexico City Metro Line 1 is one of the twelve metro lines operating in Mexico City, Mexico. Officially inaugurated in 1969, it went to become the first metro line to be built in the country. Its identifying color is pink and it runs through the city from west to east.

General information
The line is built under several avenues: Parque Lira, Pedro Antonio de los Santos, Circuito Interior, Avenida de los Insurgentes, Avenida Chapultepec, Arcos de Belén, Balderas, Eje Central Lázaro Cárdenas, José María Izazaga, Isabel la Católica, Anillo de Circunvalación, Congreso de la Unión, Eduardo Molina, and Ignacio Zaragoza.

It commutes with Lines 7 and 9 at the Station Tacubaya, Line3 at Balderas, Line8 at Salto del Agua, Line2 at Pino Suárez, Line4 at Candelaria, LineB at San Lázaro and Lines 5, 9and A at Pantitlán. When Line12 extension is completed, it will also connect with Line12 at Observatorio.

History
The first section of Line 1 was opened on 4 September 1969 as part of Mexico City Metro's first construction stage, it was inaugurated by Gustavo Díaz Ordaz, President of Mexico from 1964 to 1970, and Alfonso Corona del Rosal, Regent of the Federal District Department. The inauguration ceremony took place at the Insurgentes station.

The next day the line was opened to the public. To the original route (Chapultepec–Zaragoza) a new station, Juanacatlán, was added to the west on 11 April 1970, and the first correspondencia (a transfer station) became functional on 1 August 1970 when Line2 was opened. The two westernmost stations Tacubaya and current terminal Observatorio were inaugurated on 20 November 1970 and 10 June 1972 respectively.

Station Pantitlán was opened on 22 August 1984 as the eastern terminal during a fourth and final expansion. The1 is the only line in the network that is fully underground except for some surface track in Observatorio used for maintenance.

As of 2020, an extension of Line12 is under construction, this stretch will connect Line12 with Line1 at the Observatorio station.

Authorities warned on 10 August 2020 that Line1 is in danger of a major fire due to an aging electrical system that is in need of major improvements. Lines 1, 2, and 3 report an average of 2.5 electrical failures daily. As a result, the line will undergo renovations that require its closure. The first closure will be from Pantitlán to Salto de Agua stations starting on 11 July 2022 and concluding in March 2023. The second closure will be from Balderas to Observatorio stations and will conclude in August 2023. During both periods, all railway elements will be replaced with modern material, the wiring will be replaced, damage due to leaks and cracks will be repaired, stations that are not yet modernized will be updated, and accessibility will be added to stations that lack it.

Chronology
September 4, 1969: from Chapultepec to Zaragoza.
April 11, 1970: from Chapultepec to Juanacatlán.
November 20, 1970: from Juanacatlán to Tacubaya.
June 10, 1972: from Tacubaya to Observatorio.
August 22, 1984: from Zaragoza to Pantitlán.

Rolling stock
Line 1 has had different types of rolling stock throughout the years.
Alstom MP-68, 1969–2018
Concarril NM-73, since 1978
Alstom MP-82, 1985–1994
Concarril NM-83, 1989–2018
CAF  NE-92, 1994–2018
Bombardier NC-82, 2006–2007
Concarril NM-79, 2011–2012
CAF NM-16, since 2018

Currently, out of the 390 trains in the Mexico City Metro network, 49 are in service in Line1.

Station list

The stations from west to east: 
{| class="wikitable" rules="all"
|-
!rowspan="2" | No.
!rowspan="2" | Station
!rowspan="2" | Date opened
!rowspan="2" | Level
!colspan="2" | Distance (km)
!rowspan="2" | Connection
!rowspan="2" | Location
|-
!style="font-size: 65%;"|Betweenstations
!style="font-size: 65%;"|Total
|-
|style="background: #; color: white;"|01
|Pantitlán 
|August 22, 1984
| rowspan="16" |Undergroundtrench
|style="text-align:right;"|-
|style="text-align:right;"|0.0
|
  Line 5
  Line 9
  Line A
 Pantitlán
  Line 4 (Alameda Oriente branch): Pantitlán station
  Line III: Pantitlán station (temporary Line1 service)
 Route: 168 (also temporary Line1 service)
  Line 2: Pantitlán stop
 Routes: 11-B, 11-C, 19-F, 19-G
|rowspan="9"|Venustiano Carranza
|-
|style="background: #; color: white;"|02
|Zaragoza 
| rowspan="16" |September 4, 1969
|style="text-align:right;"|1.5
|style="text-align:right;"|1.5
|
 Zaragoza
 Routes: 162B, 163, 163A, 163B, 164, 166, 167 (also temporary Line1 service)
|-
|style="background: #; color: white;"|03
|Gomez Farías 
|style="text-align:right;"|0.9
|style="text-align:right;"|2.4
|
 Gómez Farías stop (temporary Line1 service)
|-
|style="background: #; color: white;"|04
|Boulevard Puerto Aéreo 
|style="text-align:right;"|0.7
|style="text-align:right;"|3.1
|
 Boulevard Puerto Aéreo
 Route: 43 (also temporary Line1 service)
  Line 4: Boulevard Puerto Aéreo stop
 Routes: 20-B, 22-D
|-
|style="background: #; color: white;"|05
|Balbuena 
| style="text-align:right;" |0.8
|style="text-align:right;"|3.9
|
 Balbuena
 Balbuena stop (temporary Line1 service)
|-
|style="background: #; color: white;"|06
|Moctezuma 
|style="text-align:right;"|0.8
|style="text-align:right;"|4.7
|
  Line 4 Moctezuma station (at distance)
  Line 5 Moctezuma station (at distance)
 Moctezuma stop (temporary Line1 service)
 Routes: 19-E, 19-F, 19-G, 19-H (all at distance)
|-
|style="background: #; color: white;"|07
|San Lázaro 
| style="text-align:right;" |0.7
|style="text-align:right;"|5.4
|
  Line B
 San Lázaro
  Line 4: San Lázaro station
  Line 5: San Lázaro station
 San Lázaro stop (temporary Line1 service)
 East Bus Terminal (TAPO)
|-
|style="background: #; color: white;"|08
|Candelaria
|style="text-align:right;"|1.1
|style="text-align:right;"|6.4
|
  Line 4
  Line 4: Cecilio Robelo station (at distance)
 Route: 37 (also temporary Line1 service)
 Route: 5-A
|-
|style="background: #; color: white;"|09
|Merced 
|style="text-align:right;"|0.9
|style="text-align:right;"|7.3
|
  Line 4: La Merced station
 Merced stop (temporary Line1 service)
 Route: 5-A
|-
|style="background: #; color: white;"|10
|Pino Suárez 
|style="text-align:right;"|0.8
|style="text-align:right;"|8.2
|
<li>  Line 2
<li> Passage Zócalo-Pino Suárez
<li> Nezahualcóyotl (at distance)
<li>
<li>  Line 4: Pino Suárez station (south route)
<li> Routes: 2-A, 31-B, 111-A, 145-A (also temporary Line1 service)
<li> Routes: 17-C, 17-H, 17-I, 19-E, 19-F, 19-G, 19-H
|rowspan="8"|Cuauhtémoc
|-
|style="background: #; color: white;"|11
|Isabel la Católica 
|style="text-align:right;"|0.5
|style="text-align:right;"|8.7
|
<li>
<li> Isabel la Católica stop (temporary Line1 service)
<li> Routes: 19-E, 19-F, 19-G, 19-H
|-
|style="background: #; color: white;"|12
|Salto del Agua 
|style="text-align:right;"|0.6
|style="text-align:right;"|9.3
|
<li>  Line 8
<li>
<li> Salto del Agua stop (temporary Line1 service)
<li>  Line 1: Salto del Agua stop
<li> Routes: 19-E, 19-F, 19-G, 19-H
|-
|style="background: #; color: white;"|13
|Balderas 
|style="text-align:right;"|0.6
|style="text-align:right;"|9.9
|
<li>
<li> Route: 34-A
<li>  Line 3
<li>  Line 3: Balderas station
<li> Temporary Line 1 service: Balderas stop
<li> Route: 34-A (temporary Line1 service)

<li> Routes: 19-E, 19-F, 19-G, 19-H
|-
|style="background: #; color: white;"|14
|Cuauhtémoc 
|style="text-align:right;"|0.5
|style="text-align:right;"|10.5
|
<li>
<li>  Line 3: Cuauhtémoc station
<li> Route: 34-A
<li>  Line 2: Cuauhtémoc stop
<li> Routes: 19-E, 19-F, 19-G, 19-H
|-
|style="background: #; color: white;"|15
|Insurgentes 
|style="text-align:right;"|0.9
|style="text-align:right;"|11.4
|
<li>
<li>  Line 1: Glorieta de los Insurgentes station
<li> Route: 34-A
<li> Routes: 18-C (at distance), 19-E, 19-F, 19-G, 19-H
|-
|style="background: #; color: white;"|16
|Sevilla 
|style="text-align:right;"|0.8
|style="text-align:right;"|12.2
|
<li>
<li> Routes: 19, 19-A, 34-A
<li> Routes: 13-D, 18-C, 19-E, 19-F, 19-G, 19-H
|-
|style="background: #; color: white;"|17
|Chapultepec
| rowspan="2" |Undergroundtwo-story trench
|style="text-align:right;"|0.6
|style="text-align:right;"|12.9
|
<li> Chapultepec
<li>
<li>  Line 7: Chapultepec station (at distance)
<li> Routes: 11-A, 13-A, 34-A, 115-A, 200
<li>  Line 2: Chapultepec stop
<li>  Line 6: Chapultepec stop<li> Routes: 7-D, 8-A, 8-B, 8-C, 8-D, 13-C, 13-E, 18-C, 18-D, 19-E, 19-F, 19-G, 19-H, 21-A

|-
|style="background: #; color: white;"|18
|Juanacatlán 
|April 11, 1970
|style="text-align:right;"|1.1
|style="text-align:right;"|14.0
|
<li>
<li> Routes: 13-A, 115-A
<li> Route: 21-A
|rowspan="2"|Miguel Hidalgo
|-
|style="background: #; color: white;"|19
|Tacubaya 
|November 20, 1970
|Undergroundmulti-story trench
|style="text-align:right;"|1.3
|style="text-align:right;"|15.2
|
<li>  Line 7
<li>  Line 9
<li> Tacubaya
<li> (at distance)
<li>  Line 2: Tacubaya station
<li> Routes: 110, 110-B, 110-C, 112, 113-B, 115, 118, 119, 200
<li> Routes: 1-B, 9-C, 9-E, 21-A
|-
|style="background: #; color: white;"|20
|Observatorio 
|June 10, 1972
|Hillside trench
|style="text-align:right;"|1.4
|style="text-align:right;"|16.7
|
<li>  Line 12 (under construction)
<li> West Bus Terminal
<li> Observatorio
<li> Toluca–Mexico City commuter rail(under construction)
 Route: 21-D
|Álvaro Obregón
|}

Renamed stations

Ridership
The following table shows each of Line 1 stations total and average daily ridership during 2019.

Tourism
Line 1 passes near several places of interest.
Bosque de Chapultepec, city park
Museo de Arte Moderno, museum of modern art
Chapultepec Castle
Heroic Cadets Memorial, a monument dedicated to the memory of the Niños Héroes
Chapultepec Zoo
Estela de Luz, a monument that commemorates the bicentenary of Mexico's independence
Paseo de la Reforma, emblematic avenue of Mexico City
Diana the Huntress Fountain, a monumental fountain of Diana located at Paseo de la Reforma
Angel of Independence, a victory column on a roundabout on the major thoroughfare of Paseo de la Reforma
Zona Rosa, a neighborhood known for its shopping centers, nightlife, gay community, and Korean community
Historic center of Mexico City

See also
List of Mexico City Metro lines

Notes and references

1969 establishments in Mexico
1
Railway lines opened in 1969